Charitina is the feminine form of the Greek name Chariton. It may refer to:

 Saint Charitina of Amisus (died in 304)
 Saint Charitina of Lithuania (died in 1281)

See also
Haritina (disambiguation), another variant